Sleeping Buffalo Rock is a site on the National Register of Historic Places located near Saco, Montana.  It was added to the Register in 1996.

The placard reads:
A nearby wind-swept ridge overlooking the Cree Crossing on the Milk River was the original resting place of this ancient weather-worn effigy. There the boulder sat as the leader of a herd of reclining buffalo envisioned in an outcrop of granite. Incised markings made in the distant past define its horns, eyes, backbone, and ribs. Since late prehistoric times, native peoples of the Northern Plains have revered the Sleeping Buffalo's spiritual power. Oral traditions reveal that it was well known to the Cree, Chippewa, Sioux, Assiniboine, and Gros Ventre as well as the more distant Blackfeet, Crow, and Northern Cheyenne. Stories passed from generation to generation tell how the "herd" fooled more than one buffalo-hunting party. While each tribe has its own culture and beliefs, native peoples share a worldview intertwining the sacred and secular. A Chippewa-Cree elder explained, "These rocks are sacred, just like our old people." In 1932, the Sleeping Buffalo was separated from its ridgetop companions. Relocated to the City Park in Malta, the Sleeping Buffalo was said to have been restless; stories are told of its changing position and nighttime bellowing. Moved to this site in 1967 from old Highway 2, the Sleeping Buffalo was later rejoined by the larger "Medicine Rock" in 1987, also collected near Cree Crossing. These timeless objects continue to figure prominently in traditional ceremonies. They provide a link to ancestral peoples of the high plains and the long ago time when, as one elder put it, "The power of the prairie was the buffalo."

Popular culture
The monument provides the setting in "Sleeping Buffalo", a song by Canadian folk musician Garnet Rogers.

References

Properties of religious function on the National Register of Historic Places in Montana
Geography of Phillips County, Montana
Natural features on the National Register of Historic Places in Montana
National Register of Historic Places in Phillips County, Montana